Epidromia is a genus of moths in the family Erebidae. The genus was erected by Achille Guenée in 1852.

Species
 Epidromia arenosa Walker
 Epidromia consperata Dognin, 1912
 Epidromia flavilineata Hampson
 Epidromia lienaris Hübner, 1823
 Epidromia pannosa Guenée, 1852
 Epidromia pedestris Walker
 Epidromia poaphiloides (Guenée, 1852)
 Epidromia profecta Walker
 Epidromia rotundata Herrich-Schäffer
 Epidromia sigillata Walker
 Epidromia zephyritis Schaus, 1923

References

Omopterini
Moth genera